Mailen Auroux and Nataša Zorić were the defending champions, but both chose not to participate.

Maria João Koehler and Katalin Marosi won the title, defeating Maria Abramović and Mihaela Buzărnescu in the final, 6–0, 6–3.

Seeds

Draw

References 
 Draw

Zagreb Ladies Open - Doubles
2011 in Croatian tennis
Zagreb Ladies Open